Dionísio Azevedo, stage name of Taufic Jacob (4 April 1922 – 11 December 1994) was a Brazilian television, theatre, and film actor, director, and writer.

Career
He started his career as an actor in Rádio Record in 1942. He moved to television, where he was a pioneer, creating TV de Vanguarda, a television theater popular in the 1950s. He directed several telenovelas, including Os Humildes, which is considered the first to address Brazilian themes, and Ambição, the first diary telenovela of the country. In cinema he acted in about 40 films. In 1989, he won the Gramado Film Festival Jury Award for his role on the film A Marvada Carne.

Partial filmography

 Quase no Céu (1949)
 Corações na Sombra (1951) - (voice)
 Custa Pouco a Felicidade (1953)
 Mãos Sangrentas (1955) - (voice)
 O Sobrado (1956) - Fandango
 Cidade Ameaçada (1960) - Chief of police
 Estrada do Amor (1960)
 A Moça do Quarto 13 (1960) - (voice)
 Sua Vida Me Pertence (1961, TV Series)
 The First Mass (1961) - Mestre Zuza
 The Fisherman and His Soul (1961)
 O Pagador de Promessas (1962) - Olavo, the Priest
 Lampião, o Rei do Cangaço (1964) - João de Mariano
 O Santo Milagroso (1967) - Padre José
 Corisco, O Diabo Loiro (1969) - Compadre mariano
 Independência ou Morte (1972) - José Bonifácio
 Longo Caminho da Morte (1972) - Coronel Múcio
 Obsessão (1973)
 A Virgem (1973)
 A Pequena Órfã (1973) - Velho Gui
 Sedução (1974)
 O Dia em Que o Santo Pecou (1975) - Delegado
 Kung Fu Contra as Bonecas (1975)
 Bacalhau (1975) - Petrônio
 O Dia das Profissionais (1976)
 A Noite da Fêmeas (1976)
 O Caçador de Esmeraldas (1979) - Padre João Leite
 Verde Vinho (1982) - Alfredo Morais
 Fuscão Preto (1983)
 O Menino Arco-Íris (1983) - Lucena
 A Marvada Carne (1985) - Nhô Totó
 Os Bons Tempos Voltaram (1985) - Argemiro (segment "Primeiro de Abril")
 Kuarup (1989) - D. Anselmo
 Eternidade (1992) - Balteano (final film role)

References

External links

1922 births
1994 deaths
20th-century Brazilian male actors
Brazilian film directors
Brazilian male film actors
Brazilian male television actors
Brazilian television directors
Deaths from lung cancer in Brazil
People from Minas Gerais
Brazilian people of Arab descent